Eric Butorac and Rajeev Ram were the defending champions, but lost in the first round to Yves Allegro and Stanislas Wawrinka.

In the final, Marcel Granollers and Santiago Ventura defeated Lu Yen-hsun and Janko Tipsarević, 7–5, 6–2.

Seeds

Draw

Draw

External links
Main Draw

Aircel Chennai Open - Doubles
2010 Aircel Chennai Open
Maharashtra Open